Ernest Rixon Phythian (16 July 1942 – 3 August 2020) was an English professional footballer who played as a striker. Active between 1960 and 1968, Phythian made over 250 appearances in the Football League, scoring nearly 100 goals.

Early and personal life
Born in Farnworth, Phythian was related to footballer Jimmy Seddon and referee Ken Seddon.

Career
As a child he captained Farnworth Schoolboys and played for Lancashire Schoolboys. He also played cricket for North of England Schools and for various clubs around Bolton.

He began his career with Bolton Wanderers as an amateur at the age of 15, initially combining his football career with work as an apprentice toolmaker. He made his first-team debut in 1960, aged 17.

He later played for Wrexham and Hartlepools United before moving to South Africa to play with Southern Suburbs.

He was also an England Youth international.

Later life and death
He died on 3 August 2020, aged 78, in Johannesburg, South Africa.

References

1942 births
2020 deaths
People from Farnworth
English footballers
Bolton Wanderers F.C. players
Wrexham A.F.C. players
Hartlepool United F.C. players
English Football League players
Association football forwards
English expatriate footballers
English expatriates in South Africa
Expatriate soccer players in South Africa
England youth international footballers
Southern Suburbs F.C. players